Slaves and Masters is the thirteenth studio album by the British rock band Deep Purple, and was released on 23 October 1990. This is the only Deep Purple album to feature former Rainbow lead vocalist Joe Lynn Turner, who had joined the previous year after the firing of Ian Gillan. Before hiring Turner, the band had considered singer Jimi Jamison of Survivor, but other obligations made him unavailable.

Following its release, Slaves and Masters peaked at No. 87 on the US Billboard 200 chart. The album dramatically sold below expectations, as compared to Deep Purple's previous album, The House of Blue Light with Gillan, which charted at No. 34 in the US. A song from the Slaves and Masters recording sessions was rearranged for the soundtrack of the 1990 movie Fire, Ice and Dynamite. Jon Lord did not play on the song, which was performed by the four other members of the Mark V Deep Purple line-up.

Despite underwhelming album sales, Deep Purple had a relatively successful tour in support of Slaves and Masters in 1991, especially for the band's European leg. Turner was still a member of the group when they began writing and recording their next album in 1992, but under duress from managers who were eyeing a 25th anniversary tour, Deep Purple ultimately decided to bring back the Mark II line-up for their 1993 studio album The Battle Rages On... A handful of working tracks originally intended for the follow-up to Slaves and Masters would turn up on subsequent solo releases by Turner.

"Too Much Is Not Enough" had been recorded by Turner for the unreleased follow up of his first solo album Rescue You, and it was also recorded by Paul Rodgers and Kenney Jones band The Law but they didn't release it, either. Turner's original version can be found on the bootleg Demos '88 - 91''' and The Law version on The Law II bootleg. Turner re-recorded the song for his album Hurry Up and Wait (1998).

Promotional videos
The album was promoted on television with professional music videos to the songs "King of Dreams" and "Love Conquers All". Both featured members of the band. The video for "King of Dreams" was shot at Santa Cruz Beach Boardwalk.

Live performances
With the exception of "King of Dreams", "The Cut Runs Deep" and "Love Conquers All", which have been occasionally performed by Joe Lynn Turner during his solo performances, none of the songs from Slaves and Masters have been performed live since Deep Purple's 1991 World Tour. The world tour set list also included "Burn" and "Hey Joe", which had always been vetoed by Ian Gillan. "King of Dreams" was also part of the set list of the Hughes Turner Project's European and Japanese tours in 2002. This version can be found on HTP's live album Live in Tokyo (2002).

Reception

Following its release, Slaves and Masters was met with mixed reception from critics. AllMusic's Alex Henderson gave the album a negative review, saying that "the songwriting is weak and pedestrian, and most of the time, the once-mighty Purple (who were at least 16 years past their prime) sound like a generic Foreigner wannabe". The same concept was expressed in the reviews by journalists Martin Popoff and Joel McIver, who described Slaves and Masters "a bit like a latter-day Rainbow album" and an "extravagant piece of AOR-ness ... incredibly lightweight", respectively. However, they salvaged a few songs, such as "King of Dreams", "Love Conquers All" and "Fire in the Basement", which "make at least a reasonable effort to match Purple’s catalogue".

Jon Lord himself, more than his mates Glover and Paice, never recognized this record as a Deep Purple album.
On the other hand, Turner openly praised Slaves and Masters'' by saying it was "probably (the) last great Purple album there was (...) It's a great album, (it) stands up to these days, one of the best recorded, best written (...) I can name every title and just go...who can beat that?".

Track listing

The vinyl edition has "Fortuneteller" as track 4

Fire Ice & Dynamite (Music from the Original Soundtrack)
 "Fire, Ice & Dynamite" (Blackmore, Glover, Turner) - 4:33

Personnel
Deep Purple
 Joe Lynn Turner – lead vocals
 Ritchie Blackmore – guitars
 Roger Glover – bass, additional keyboards, production, mixing
 Jon Lord – organ, keyboards, string arrangements
 Ian Paice – drums

Additional musicians
 String orchestra led by Jesse Levy

Production notes
 Recorded in early/mid 1990 at Greg Rike Productions in Orlando, Florida
 Additional recordings at Sountec Studios Inc. and the Powerstation in New York
 Engineered by Nick Blagona
 Additional mixing by Nick Blagona at The Powerstation
 Raymond D'Addario – production assistant
 Wally Walters, Peter Hodgson, Matthew Lamonica, Dan Gellert - assistant engineers
 Mastered by Greg Calbi at Sterling Sound, New York

Charts
 

Album 

Singles

Certifications

References 

Deep Purple albums
1990 albums
Albums produced by Roger Glover
RCA Records albums